Jebediah Lee Putzier (pronounced PUTT-zeer) (born January 20, 1979) is a former American football tight end. He was drafted in the 6th round of the 2002 NFL Draft by the Denver Broncos. Putzier also played for the Houston Texans, Seattle Seahawks, and the UFL's Omaha Nighthawks.

Early years
Putzier attended Eagle High School in his hometown Eagle, Idaho. In addition to playing football, Putzier also garnered athletic letters in basketball, track and baseball.

College career
Putzier initially walked on to the Boise State Broncos football team. After playing wide receiver for the first three years of his career, Putzier switched to tight end. He led all college tight ends with twelve touchdown receptions his senior season, and garnered all-Western Athletic Conference honors. The season was highlighted by a three-touchdown effort against Tulsa.

Professional career

Denver Broncos
Putzier was drafted by the Denver Broncos in the sixth round (191st overall) of the 2002 NFL Draft. After only recording four receptions his first two years, he contributed to the Broncos in 2004 with 36 catches.  His play earned him a 5-year $12.5 million offer sheet from the New York Jets which the Broncos matched.  Despite putting up 37 receptions in 2005 the Broncos released him in spring 2006 in what was considered to be a salary cap purge.

Houston Texans
Putzier signed with the Houston Texans in 2006, coming back to former Broncos offensive coordinator Gary Kubiak. After losing spots on the depth chart in 2007, the Texans released Putzier on February 20, 2008.

Seattle Seahawks
On March 4, 2008, Putzier was signed by the Seattle Seahawks. After appearing in seven games for the team, he was released on November 25.

Denver Broncos (second stint)
Late in the 2008 season, Putzier signed with the Broncos.  He was resigned on March 16, 2009, but was cut late in 2009 training camp.

Hartford Colonials
After not playing for any professional team in 2009, Putzier signed to play in the United Football League. He was released by the Hartford Colonials on June 16, 2010.

Omaha Nighthwaks
Putzier played in the 2010 UFL season with the Omaha Nighthawks. On October 2, Putzier caught a game-winning touchdown from Jeff Garcia to defeat the Sacramento Mountain Lions. Putzier tied for the league lead in receiving touchdowns in 2010, scoring three on the year.

Personal life
Putzier also played basketball at Boise State and majored in English.

Putzier is married, divorced and remarried. Due to concussions and cortisone shots, he had to quit his job for a medical equipment company. After a suicide attempt, Putzier was later diagnosed with post-concussion syndrome.

References

External links
Denver Broncos bio
Houston Texans bio
Seattle Seahawks bio

1979 births
Living people
American football wide receivers
American football tight ends
Boise State Broncos men's basketball players
Boise State Broncos football players
Denver Broncos players
Houston Texans players
Seattle Seahawks players
Hartford Colonials players
Omaha Nighthawks players
People from Eagle, Idaho
American men's basketball players